Newington Plantation is a historic archaeological site located near Stallsville, Dorchester County, South Carolina. The plantation was originally settled in the early or middle 1680s. Newington includes the remains of a series of house forms as they developed from an early single timber and clay structure destroyed sometime around the Yamasee War in 1715 to the fine, large brick structure built by Joseph Blake. The plantation included terraced gardens, a reflecting pool, brick outbuildings, and the main house.  The house burned in 1845, and the ruins stood until 1876, when an attempt made to salvage the bricks failed. After years under the plow, many of the ruins on the surface have disappeared and the ornamental lake has silted and gone to ruin.

It was added to the National Register of Historic Places in 1974.

References

Anti-black racism in the United States
Plantation houses in South Carolina
Archaeological sites on the National Register of Historic Places in South Carolina
National Register of Historic Places in Dorchester County, South Carolina
Burned houses in the United States